String Quintet No. 1 may refer to:

 String Quintet No. 1 (Brahms)
 String Quintet No. 1 (Dvořák)
 String Quintet No. 1 (Mendelssohn)
 String Quintet No. 1 (Mozart)